The Calais–Milltown Border Crossing connects the towns of Calais, Maine and St. Stephen, New Brunswick on the Canada–US border. This crossing is located at the Milltown International Bridge.  Various bridges have existed at this location since 1825.    Canada built its border crossing station in 1967.  The US border station was built in 1938 and was rebuilt in 2014.

See also
 List of Canada–United States border crossings

References

Canada–United States border crossings
1896 establishments in Maine
1896 establishments in New Brunswick
Buildings and structures in Calais, Maine
St. Stephen, New Brunswick